|}

The Gimcrack Stakes is a Group 2 flat horse race in Great Britain open to two-year-old colts and geldings.

It is run at York over a distance of 6 furlongs (1,207 metres), and it is scheduled to take place each year in August.

History
The event is named after Gimcrack, a successful racehorse in the 18th century. Gimcrack won twenty-seven times in a career of thirty-six races, but none of his victories were achieved at York.

The Gimcrack Stakes was established in 1846, and it was originally open to horses of either gender. It was restricted to male horses in 1987.

The race is currently staged on the third day of York's four-day Ebor Festival meeting.

The owner of the winning horse is traditionally invited to give a speech at the annual Gimcrack Dinner, which is held at the racecourse in December.

Records
Leading jockey (9 wins):
 John Osborne, Jr. – Exact (1852), Coastguard (1863), Wild Agnes (1864), Lord of the Vale (1865), Bothwell (1870), Thorn (1872), Holy Friar (1874), Constantine (1876), Simnel (1880)

Leading trainer (7 wins):
 William I'Anson, Jr. – Pursebearer (1881), Castor (1885), Lady Muncaster (1886), Derwentwater (1887), Lockhart (1889), Royal Stag (1890), Barbette (1903)

Winners since 1910

Earlier winners

 1846: Ellerdale
 1847: Tuscan
 1848: Glauca
 1849: Mildew
 1850: Aaron Smith
 1851: Trousseau
 1852: Exact
 1853: Barrel
 1854: Nettle
 1855: Mirage
 1856: Blink Bonny
 1857: Princess Royal
 1858: Rainbow
 1859: Thormanby
 1860: Prudence
 1861: Johnny Armstrong
 1862: Le Marechal
 1863: Coastguard
 1864: Wild Agnes
 1865: Lord of the Vale
 1866: Blinkhoolie
 1867: The Earl
 1868: Lady Dewhurst
 1869: Hester
 1870: Bothwell
 1871: Lilian
 1872: Thorn
 1873: Padoroshna
 1874: Holy Friar
 1875: Springfield
 1876: Constantine
 1877: King Olaf
 1878: Amice
 1879: Duke of Cumberland
 1880: Simnel
 1881: Pursebearer
 1882: The Golden Farmer
 1883: Juventus
 1884: Thuringian Queen
 1885: Castor
 1886: Lady Muncaster
 1887: Derwentwater
 1888: Cheroot
 1889: Lockhart
 1890: Royal Stag
 1891: Therapia
 1892: Peppercorn
 1893: Styx
 1894: Bentworth
 1895: Amphora
 1896: Silver Fox
 1897: Mauchline
 1898: Queen Fairy
 1899: Dusky Queen
 1900: Garb Or
 1901: Sterling Balm
 1902: Chaucer
 1903: Barbette
 1904: Desiree
 1905: Colonia
 1906: Polar Star
 1907: Royal Realm
 1908: Blankney II
 1909: Lily Rose

See also
 Horse racing in Great Britain
 List of British flat horse races

References

 Paris-Turf:
 Racing Post:

 galopp-sieger.de – Gimcrack Stakes.
 ifhaonline.org – International Federation of Horseracing Authorities – Gimcrack Stakes (2019).
 pedigreequery.com – Gimcrack Stakes – York.
 

Flat races in Great Britain
York Racecourse
Flat horse races for two-year-olds
Recurring sporting events established in 1846
1846 establishments in England